Nicole Amy Doria-Rose (born 1970) is an American biologist. She is chief of the humoral immunology core at the Vaccine Research Center. She develops and applies assays to evaluate HIV-1 specific antibody responses during natural infection and after immunization.

Education 
Doria-Rose graduated from Hunter College High School in New York City in 1987. She obtained her Bachelor of Arts in biology in 1991 and a Ph.D. in 1998 from Cornell University. During her doctoral studies, she trained under advisor Volker Vogt in the department of biochemistry, molecular and cell biology. Her dissertation was titled In vivo selection of Rous sarcoma virus mutants with randomized sequences in the packaging signal.

From 1998 to 2003, Doria-Rose worked as a postdoctoral scientist in the laboratory of Nancy Haigwood at the Seattle Biomedical Research Institute (SBRI) and the department of pathobiology at University of Washington. Doria-Rose was promoted to the position of associate scientist at SBRI in 2003. While working as a post-doctoral fellow, Doria-Rose was also appointed as associate faculty in the science department at Shoreline Community College in 2000.

Career 
Doria-Rose joined the National Institute of Allergy and Infectious Diseases in 2006 as a senior research fellow in the laboratory of immunoregulation. In 2011, she became a staff scientist at the Vaccine Research Center, where she has worked on isolating new, potent anti-HIV monoclonal antibodies and studying their development over time. In 2012, she was promoted to the position of Chief of the humoral immunology core.

Doria-Rose develops and applies assays to evaluate HIV-1 specific antibody responses during natural infection and after immunization.

References 

Living people
Place of birth missing (living people)
National Institutes of Health people
21st-century American biologists
21st-century American women scientists
American medical researchers
Women medical researchers
American women biologists
Cornell University alumni
1970 births
20th-century American biologists
20th-century American women scientists
Hunter College High School alumni